Bernadine L. Craft is an American politician and a former Democratic member of the Wyoming State Senate and previously a member of Wyoming House of Representatives, and had represented the 12th district from January 7, 2013 to January 10, 2017.

Craft first ran for and won a seat in the Wyoming House of Representatives in 2006, representing the city of Rock Springs.  In 2012, Craft announced that she would run for the 12th district in the Wyoming Senate, replacing outgoing Marty Martin.  JoAnn Dayton succeeded Craft as the Democratic nominee, but lost to Stephen Watt.  Craft, on the other hand, won the election without any opposition.

Craft was sworn in as a State Senator on January 7, 2013.  She was subsequently selected to be Senate Minority Whip.

In addition to being in the Wyoming Senate, Craft serves as Executive Director of the Sweetwater Board of Cooperative Educational Services in Rock Springs, Wyoming. She became an ordained Episcopalian Minister in the Spring of 2014.

Craft declined to run for reelection in 2016.

References

External links
Profile at Wyoming Senate official website
Profile at Project Vote Smart
Campaign contributions at followthemoney.org

Democratic Party members of the Wyoming House of Representatives
Year of birth missing (living people)
Living people
Women state legislators in Wyoming
21st-century American politicians
21st-century American women politicians